Supercheap Auto Racing was the sponsored identity of several Australian based racing teams from the mid-1990s when automotive parts retail chain Supercheap Auto began sponsoring motor racing teams. The identity has travelled from one racing team to another as the chain transferred its sponsorship. The most recent holder of the Supercheap Auto Racing identity was Supercars Championship team Triple Eight Race Engineering's Bathurst Wildcard in 2021.

Results

 Wildcards are listed in Italics

Bathurst 1000 results

References

External links

Australian brands
Auto racing series in Australia